Liquor is an alcoholic drink produced by distillation of grains, fruits, vegetables, or sugar, that have already gone through alcoholic fermentation. Other terms for liquor include: spirit, distilled beverage, spirituous liquor or hard liquor. The distillation process concentrates the liquid to increase its alcohol by volume. As liquors contain significantly more alcohol (ethanol) than other alcoholic drinks, they are considered 'harder'; in North America, the term hard liquor is sometimes used to distinguish distilled alcoholic drinks from non-distilled ones, whereas the term spirits is more common in the UK. Some examples of liquors include vodka, rum, gin, and tequila. Liquors are often aged in barrels, such as for the production of brandy and whiskey, or are infused with flavorings to form a flavored liquor such as absinthe.

While the word liquor ordinarily refers to distilled alcoholic spirits rather than beverages produced by fermentation alone, it can sometimes be used more broadly to refer to any alcoholic beverage (or even non-alcoholic products of distillation or various other liquids).

Like other alcoholic drinks, liquor is typically consumed for the psychoactive effects of alcohol. In an undiluted form, distilled beverages are often slightly sweet, and bitter, and typically impart a burning mouthfeel, with an odor derived from the alcohol and the production and aging processes; the exact flavor varies between different varieties of liquor and the different impurities they impart. Liquor is also frequently mixed with other ingredients to form a cocktail.

Rapid consumption of a large amount of liquor can cause severe alcohol intoxication or alcohol poisoning, which can be fatal. Consistent consumption of liquor over time correlates with higher mortality and other harmful health effects, even when compared to other alcoholic beverages.

Nomenclature

The term 'spirit' (singular and used without the additional term 'drink') refers to liquor that should not contain added sugar and usually is 35–40% alcohol by volume (ABV). Fruit brandy, for example, is also known as 'fruit spirit'.

Liquor bottled with added sugar and added flavorings, such as Grand Marnier, Frangelico, and American schnapps, are known instead as liqueurs.

Liquor generally has an alcohol concentration higher than 30% when bottled, and before being diluted for bottling it typically has a concentration over 50%. Beer and wine, which are not distilled, typically have a maximum alcohol content of about 15% ABV, as most yeasts cannot metabolize when the concentration of alcohol is above this level; as a consequence, fermentation ceases at that point.

Etymology
The origin of 'liquor' and its close relative 'liquid' was the Latin verb liquere, meaning 'to be fluid'. According to the Oxford English Dictionary (OED), an early use of the word in the English language, meaning simply 'a liquid', can be dated to 1225. The first use documented in the OED defined as 'a liquid for drinking' occurred in the 14th century. Its use as a term for 'an intoxicating alcoholic drink' appeared in the 16th century.

Legal definition

European Union 
In accordance with the regulation (EU) 2019/787 of the European Parliament and of the Council of April 17, 2019, a spirit drink is an alcoholic beverage that has been produced:

 either directly by using, individually or in combination, any of the following methods:
 distillation, with or without added flavorings or flavoring foodstuffs, of fermented products;
 maceration or similar processing of plant materials in ethyl alcohol of agricultural origin, distillates of agricultural origin or spirit drinks or a combination thereof;
 addition, individually or in combination, to ethyl alcohol of agricultural origin, distillates of agricultural origin, or spirit drinks of flavorings, colors, other authorized ingredients, sweetening products, other agricultural products, and foodstuffs.
 or by adding, individually or in combination, to it any of the following:
 other spirit drinks;
 ethyl alcohol of agricultural origin;
 distillates of agricultural origin;
 other foodstuffs.

Spirit drinks must contain at least 15% ABV (except in the case of egg liqueur, which must contain a minimum of 14% ABV).

Distillate of agricultural origin 
Regulation makes a difference between "ethyl alcohol of agricultural origin" and a "distillate of agricultural origin". Distillate of agricultural origin is defined as an alcoholic liquid that is the result of the distillation, after alcoholic fermentation, of agricultural products which does not have the properties of ethyl alcohol and which retain the aroma and taste of the raw materials used.

Categories 

Annex 1 to the regulation lists 44 categories of spirit drinks and their legal requirements.

Some spirit drinks can fall into more than one category. Specific production requirements distinguish one category from another (London gin falls into the Gin category but any gin cannot be considered as London gin).

Spirit drinks that are not produced within the EU, such as tequila or baijiu, are not listed in the 44 categories.

 Rum
 Whisk(e)y
 Grain spirit
 Wine spirit
 Brandy or 
 Grape marc spirit or grape marc
 Fruit marc spirit
 Raisin spirit or raisin brandy
 Fruit spirit
 Cider spirit, perry spirit and cider and perry spirit
 Honey spirit
  or lees spirit
 , or beer spirit
 Topinambur or Jerusalem artichoke spirit
 Vodka
 Spirit (supplemented by the name of the fruit, berries or nuts) obtained by maceration and distillation
  (supplemented by the name of the fruit or the raw materials used)
 Gentian
 Juniper-flavored spirit drink
 Gin
 Distilled gin
 London gin
 Caraway-flavored spirit drink or 
  or aquavit
 Aniseed-flavored spirit drink (e.g. ouzo)
 Pastis
 Pastis de Marseille
 Anis or 
 Distilled anis
 Bitter-tasting spirit drink or bitters
 Flavored vodka
 Sloe-aromatized spirit drink or 
 Liqueur
  (supplemented by the name of a fruit or other raw material used)
 Sloe gin
 Sambuca
 Maraschino, marrasquino or maraskino
 Nocino ou 
 Liqueur with egg
 
  or 
  or 
 Honey nectar or mead nectar

History of distillation

Early history

Early evidence of distillation comes from Akkadian tablets dated c. 1200 BC describing perfumery operations, providing textual evidence that an early, primitive form of distillation was known to the Babylonians of ancient Mesopotamia. Early evidence of distillation also comes from alchemists working in Alexandria, Roman Egypt, in the 1st century. Distilled water was described in the 2nd century AD by Alexander of Aphrodisias. Alchemists in Roman Egypt were using a distillation alembic or still device in the 3rd century.

Distillation was known in the ancient Indian subcontinent, evident from baked clay retorts and receivers found at Taxila and Charsadda in Pakistan and Rang Mahal in India dating to the early centuries of the Common Era. Frank Raymond Allchin says these terracotta distill tubes were "made to imitate bamboo". These "Gandhara stills" were capable of producing only very weak liquor, as there was no efficient means of collecting the vapors at low heat.

Distillation in China could have begun during the Eastern Han dynasty (1st–2nd centuries), but the distillation of beverages began in the Jin (12th–13th centuries) and Southern Song (10th–13th centuries) dynasties according to archaeological evidence.

Freeze distillation involves freezing the alcoholic beverage and then removing the ice. The freezing technique had limitations in geography and implementation limiting how widely this method was put to use.

Distillation of wine 

The flammable nature of the exhalations of wine was already known to ancient natural philosophers such as Aristotle (384–322 BCE), Theophrastus (c. 371–287 BCE), and Pliny the Elder (23/24–79 CE). This did not immediately lead to the isolation of alcohol, however,  despite the development of more advanced distillation techniques in second- and third-century Roman Egypt. An important recognition, first found in one of the writings attributed to Jābir ibn Ḥayyān (ninth century CE), was that by adding salt to boiling wine, which increases the wine's relative volatility, the flammability of the resulting vapors may be enhanced. The distillation of wine is attested in Arabic works attributed to al-Kindī (c. 801–873 CE) and to al-Fārābī (c. 872–950), and in the 28th book of al-Zahrāwī's (Latin: Abulcasis, 936–1013) Kitāb al-Taṣrīf (later translated into Latin as Liber servatoris). In the twelfth century, recipes for the production of aqua ardens ("burning water", i.e., alcohol) by distilling wine with salt started to appear in a number of Latin works, and by the end of the thirteenth century, it had become a widely known substance among Western European chemists. Its medicinal properties were studied by Arnald of Villanova (1240–1311 CE) and John of Rupescissa (c. 1310–1366), the latter of whom regarded it as a life-preserving substance able to prevent all diseases (the aqua vitae or "water of life", also called by John the quintessence of wine).

In China, archaeological evidence indicates that the true distillation of alcohol began during the 12th century Jin or Southern Song dynasties.
A still has been found at an archaeological site in Qinglong, Hebei, dating to the 12th century.

In India, the true distillation of alcohol was introduced from the Middle East and was in wide use in the Delhi Sultanate by the 14th century.

The works of Taddeo Alderotti (1223–1296) describe a method for concentrating alcohol involving repeated fractional distillation through a water-cooled still, by which an alcohol purity of 90% could be obtained.

In 1437, "burned water" (brandy) was mentioned in the records of the County of Katzenelnbogen in Germany.

Government regulation

Production
It is legal to distill beverage alcohol as a hobby for personal use in some countries, including New Zealand and the Netherlands.

In the United States, it is illegal to distill beverage alcohol without a license, and the licensing process is too arduous for hobbyist-scale production. In some parts of the U.S., it is also illegal to sell a still without a license. Nonetheless, all states allow unlicensed individuals to make their own beer, and some also allow unlicensed individuals to make their own wine (although making beer and wine is also prohibited in some local jurisdictions).

Sale
Some countries and sub-national jurisdictions limit or prohibit the sale of certain very high-percentage alcohol, commonly known as neutral spirit.

From 1930 to 1990, it was illegal to sell spirits in Uruguay that were privately produced, thus every comercial spirit had to be made by Ancap, the  national distillery had the legal monopoly of the spirit market.

Due to its flammability (see below) alcoholic beverages with an alcohol content above 70% by volume are not permitted to be transported in aircraft.

Microdistilling
Microdistilling (also known as craft distilling) began to re-emerge as a trend in the United States following the microbrewing and craft beer movement in the last decades of the 20th century. In contrast, large-scale distillation facilities were never as dominant in Scotland, so the tradition of small-scale distillation was never really lost in the Scotch whisky market.

Flammability

This temperature is called its flash point.

The flammability of liquor is applied in the cooking technique flambé.

The flash points of alcohol concentrations from 10% ABV to 96% ABV are:
 10% –  – ethanol-based water solution
 12.5% – about  – wine
 15% –  – sake, mijiu, cheongju 
 20% –  – shōchū, fortified wine
 30% –  – strong shōchū
 40% –  – typical vodka, whisky or brandy
 50% –  – typical baijiu, strong whisky, bottled in bond whisky, typical blanche absinthe
 60% –  – strong baijiu, normal tsikoudia (called mesoraki or middle raki), barrel proof whisky, typical verte absinthe
 70% –  – slivovitz
 80% –  – strong absinthe
 90% or more –  – neutral grain spirit

Serving

Liquor can be served:
 Neat – at room temperature without any additional ingredient(s)
 Up – shaken or stirred with ice, strained, and served in a stemmed glass
 Down – shaken or stirred with ice, strained, and served in a rocks glass
 On the rocks – over ice cubes
 Blended or frozen – blended with ice
 With a simple mixer, such as club soda, tonic water, juice, or cola
 As an ingredient of a cocktail
 As an ingredient of a shooter
 With water
 With water poured over sugar (as with absinthe)

Alcohol consumption by country

The World Health Organization (WHO) measures and publishes alcohol consumption patterns in different countries. The WHO measures alcohol consumed by persons 15 years of age or older and reports it on the basis of liters of pure alcohol consumed per capita in a given year in a country.

In Europe, spirits (especially vodka) are more popular in the north and east of the continent.

Health effects

Short-term effects

Distilled spirits contain ethyl alcohol, the same chemical that is present in beer and wine, and as such, spirit consumption has short-term psychological and physiological effects on the user. Different concentrations of alcohol in the human body have different effects on a person. The effects of alcohol depend on the amount an individual has drunk, the percentage of alcohol in the spirits and the timespan that the consumption took place, the amount of food eaten, and whether an individual has taken other prescription, over-the-counter or street drugs, among other factors.

Drinking enough to cause a blood alcohol concentration (BAC) of 0.03%–0.12% typically causes an overall improvement in mood and possible euphoria, increased self-confidence, and sociability, decreased anxiety, a flushed, red appearance in the face and impaired judgment and fine muscle coordination. A BAC of 0.09% to 0.25% causes lethargy, sedation, balance problems, and blurred vision. A BAC from 0.18% to 0.30% causes profound confusion, impaired speech (e.g., slurred speech), staggering, dizziness and vomiting. A BAC from 0.25% to 0.40% causes stupor, unconsciousness, anterograde amnesia, vomiting, and respiratory depression (potentially life-threatening). Death may occur due to inhalation of vomit (pulmonary aspiration) while unconscious. A BAC from 0.35% to 0.80% causes a coma (unconsciousness), life-threatening respiratory depression, and possibly fatal alcohol poisoning.

Heavy consumption of liquor leads to bloating, gassiness, diarrhea, painful stools, or fullness in the abdomen.

As with all alcoholic beverages, driving under the influence, operating an aircraft or heavy machinery increases the risk of an accident. As such, many countries have penalties for drunk driving.

Long-term effects

Consumption of alcohol in any quantity can cause cancer. Alcohol causes breast cancer, colorectal cancer, esophageal cancer, liver cancer, and head-and-neck cancers. The more alcohol is consumed, the higher the cancer risk.

The main active ingredient of distilled spirits is alcohol, and therefore, the health effects of alcohol apply to spirits. Drinking more than 1–2 drinks a day increases the risk of heart disease, high blood pressure, atrial fibrillation, and stroke. The risk is greater in younger people due to binge drinking, which may result in violence or accidents. About 3.3 million deaths (5.9% of all deaths) are due to alcohol each year.
Unlike wine and perhaps beer, there is no evidence for a J-shaped health effect for the consumption of distilled alcohol.

Alcoholism, also known as "alcohol use disorder", is a broad term for any drinking of alcohol that results in problems. Alcoholism reduces a person's life expectancy by around ten years and alcohol use is the third-leading cause of early death in the United States.

Demographics
Consumption of distilled alcohol is the most important single factor behind the variation in mortality rates and life expectancy for men in Europe. For example, in heavily Islamic regions of the Caucasus (Islam forbids alcohol consumption) the life expectancy gap between women and men is five years; in nearby Christian areas it is ten years, and in the Czech Republic (where beer predominates) the chance of a man dying between the ages of 15 and 60 is less than half that of nearby Ukraine.

Notes

See also

 
 
  
 
 
 
  / Shōchū / Soju

References

Bibliography

External links

 
Distillation
Drinks
Ancient inventions
Arab inventions
Alcoholic drinks